Valchedram (also transliterated Vǎlčedrǎm, Vulchedrum, etc.) is a town in northwestern Bulgaria, part of Montana Province. It is the administrative centre of Valchedram Municipality, which lies in the northeastern part of Montana Province. As of December 2009, the town has a population of 3,817 inhabitants.

Valchedram is located in the western Danubian Plain, near the Tsibritsa and Danube rivers. The first school in Valchedram was founded in 1780. The town has an imposing Bulgarian Orthodox church of Saint Paraskeva (built in 1936), as well as a small museum.

Municipality

Valchedram municipality covers an area of 426 square kilometres and includes the following 11 places:

Besides the villages, the municipality also includes the Ibisha Island nature reserve in the Danube. The population is mostly Bulgarian, with a significant Roma minority (around 30%).

Gallery

References

External links
 Valchedram municipality website 
 

Towns in Bulgaria
Populated places in Montana Province